Lischke may refer to:

Lischke (settlement)
Lischke (surname)